Robin "Bob" Coverdale (fourth ¼ 1928 – May 21, 2009), also known by the nickname of "The Mayor of Dunswell", was an English World Cup winning professional rugby league footballer who played in the 1950s and 1960s, and coached in the 1970s.

Background
Coverdale's birth was registered in Sculcoates district, Hull, East Riding of Yorkshire, England.

Playing career

International honours
Bob Coverdale won caps for Great Britain while at Hull in the 1954 Rugby League World Cup against Australia, France, New Zealand, and France.

Bob Coverdale played right-, i.e. number 10, in all four of Great Britain's 1954 Rugby League World Cup matches, including Great Britain’s 16-12 victory over France in the 1954 Rugby League World Cup Final at Parc des Princes, Paris on Saturday 13 November 1954.

Eastern Division Championship Final appearances
Bob Coverdale  played left-, i.e. number 8, in Hull Kingston Rovers' 13–10 victory over Huddersfield in the Eastern Division Championship Final during the 1962–63 season at Headingley Rugby Stadium, Leeds on Saturday 10 November 1962.

County Cup Final appearances
Bob Coverdale played in Hull FC's 2-7 defeat by Bradford Northern in the 1953–54 Yorkshire County Cup Final during the 1953–54 season at Headingley Rugby Stadium, Leeds on Saturday 31 October 1953, the 14-22 defeat by Halifax in the 1954–55 Yorkshire County Cup Final during the 1954–55 season at Headingley Rugby Stadium, Leeds on Saturday 23 October 1954, the 10-10 draw with Halifax in the 1955–56 Yorkshire County Cup Final during the 1955–56 season at Headingley Rugby Stadium, Leeds on Saturday 22 October 1955, and the 0-7 defeat by Halifax in the 1955–56 Yorkshire County Cup Final replay during the 1955–56 season at Odsal Stadium, Bradford on Wednesday 2 November 1955.

Club career
Bob Coverdale made his début for Wakefield Trinity during February 1957, and he played his last match for Wakefield Trinity during the 1957–58 season.

Note
The 'www.hullfc.com' websites states that Bob Coverdale was at Hull between 1951…57, however 'Lindley, John (1960). Dreadnoughts - A HISTORY OF Wakefield Trinity F. C. 1873 - 1960' states that he was at Wakefield Trinity between 1956…58.

References

External links
!Great Britain Statistics at englandrl.co.uk (statistics currently missing due to not having appeared for both Great Britain, and England)
(archived by web.archive.org) Workington and Hull KR triumph in the regions
 (archived by web.archive.org) Stats → PastPlayers → C at hullfc.com
 (archived by web.archive.org) Statistics at hullfc.com

1928 births
2009 deaths
English rugby league coaches
English rugby league players
Great Britain national rugby league team players
Hull F.C. players
Hull Kingston Rovers players
People from Sculcoates
Rugby league props
Rugby league players from Kingston upon Hull
Wakefield Trinity players